The Baba Tahir Mausoleum َ() belongs to the contemporary period and is located in Baba Tahir Square in Hamadan.

References 

Mausoleums in Iran
National works of Iran
Buildings and structures in Hamadan Province